Semyonkino is a rural locality (a village) in Staroyashevsky Selsoviet, Kaltasinsky District, Bashkortostan, Russia. The population was 109 as of 2010. There is 1 street.

Geography 
Semyonkino is located 38 km east of Kaltasy (the district's administrative centre) by road. Aktuganovo is the nearest rural locality.

References 

Rural localities in Kaltasinsky District